Vriesea unilateralis is a species of flowering plant in the family Bromeliaceae. It is endemic to Brazil (Paraná, Santa Catarina, Espírito Santo, Rio de Janeiro and São Paulo States). The specific epithet, is derived from Latin and means "one-sided".

References

unilateralis
Flora of Brazil
Taxa named by John Gilbert Baker
Taxa named by Carl Christian Mez